Bulgaria Air is the flag carrier airline of Bulgaria, with its headquarters at Sofia Airport in Sofia. The company is owned by Chimimport AD and is a leader in terms of local market share. The airline operates short and medium haul aircraft to destinations in Europe, the Middle East, and Russia. Focus cities in Bulgaria are Burgas and Varna. In 2018 the company carried a total of 1.267 million passengers on 5,995 flights.

History

The airline was established in 2002 as a successor to the insolvent Balkan Bulgarian Airlines and commenced operations on 4 December that year. By order of the Minister of Transport and Communications it was declared the national flag carrier in November 2002. Bulgaria Air began operations using the name Balkan Air Tour. The airline was known by that name for just a short period of time. The name Bulgaria Air and the initial logo were determined in a public competition. Bulgaria Air was privatised in 2006; although it was rumoured that the government wanted to sell the carrier to a major foreign investor, a group of locally owned companies, led by Hemus Air, emerged as the buyer with Italian airline Air One being the only other contender. Hemus Air reportedly paid €6.6 million and promised to invest a further €86 million over the next five years. Since then, all flights and operations of Hemus Air and its subsidiary Viaggio Air are under the name and management of the merged company, Bulgaria Air.

In November 2008, Bulgaria Air became a full member of the International Air Transport Association (IATA). In mid-2011 Bulgaria Air announced that they had completed a thorough analysis of its routes and had decided to acquire the new Embraer 190 aircraft. The delivery of the first new Embraer 190 aircraft occurred in March 2012. In February 2020, the airline’s CEO Yanko Georgiev stated that the carrier was in talks with two aircraft manufacturers to place an order for a single-aisle jet. They plan to order 5-6 of these aircraft to modernise their fleet and to extend their network with more aircraft available.

Corporate affairs

Bul Air
Bul Air is the charter brand of Bulgaria Air. The company was founded in 1954, but after merging with the Bulgarian national carrier TABSO became part of Balkan Bulgarian Airlines. In 2015 the company was revived by Bulgaria Air.

Frequent flyer program
Fly More is the name of the Bulgaria Air frequent flyer program. There are three levels of membership: Basic, Silver and Gold Privilege. Central Cooperative Bank is issuing Visa Classic and Visa Gold co-branded Credit Cards with Bulgaria Air.

Livery
In November 2002 public contests were held in Bulgaria to determine a name and logo for the new airline. Thousands of people showed their creativity and voiced their opinions. After searching through the submissions, the name and logo were chosen. The design was used for about four years, until 2006, when an improved, more professional design was introduced. After the full fleet integration of Hemus Air and Viaggio Air, a new livery had to be developed once again. In mid-2010, the first Bulgaria Air Airbus A319 was rolled out wearing the finalised colour scheme.

Catering
In 2010 Bulgaria Air and LSG Sky Chefs created a new airline catering company called Silver Wings. The total investment for Bulgaria Air reaches to $1.3 million. Future investment plans envision a new canteen to serve the airport staff at Sofia Airport.

Bulgaria Air Media
Bulgaria On Air: The In-Flight Magazine - Bulgaria Air's in-flight magazine. Its first edition was in 2003. In April 2011 the in-flight magazine was extended with an edition which is distributed in some hotels and shopping centres, Bulgaria On Air: The Business Magazine.

Destinations

Bulgaria Air operates 22 routes from Sofia Airport, including two domestic routes to Burgas and Varna.

Codeshare agreements
Bulgaria Air has codeshare agreements with the following airlines:

 Aegean Airlines
 Aeroflot
 Air France
 Air Serbia
 Cyprus Airways
 Iberia
 ITA Airways
 KLM
 TAROM
 Qatar Airways
 Windrose Airlines

Interline agreements 
Bulgaria Air has special interline agreements with the following airlines:

 American Airlines
 Brussels Airlines
 Emirates
 Finnair
 LATAM Brasil
 Virgin Atlantic

Charter flights 
Bulgaria Air performs charter flights for over 60 leading tour operators, air transport brokers, airlines, and other companies of the aviation and tourist industries. During the summer season the airline mainly operates flights from Bourgas and Varna airports to destinations in Germany, Israel, Lebanon, Poland, and Russia. In addition, the company operates charter flights from Sofia airport to popular holiday destinations in Egypt, Greece, Italy, Spain, Tunisia, and Turkey.

Fleet

As of November 2022, the active Bulgaria Air fleet consists of the following aircraft:

See also
Transport in Bulgaria

References

External links

Airlines of Bulgaria
Airlines established in 2002
Bulgarian brands
Bulgarian companies established in 2002